The Romania men's national under 20 ice hockey team is the national under-20 ice hockey team of Romania. The team is controlled by the Romanian Ice Hockey Federation, a member of the International Ice Hockey Federation.

History
Romania played its first game in 1983 against Australia during the Pool C tournament of the 1983 IIHF World U20 Championship. Romania won the game 10–2. Romania also gained promotion to Pool B for 1984 after winning all six of their games and finishing first in the standings. They remained in Pool B up until the 1994 IIHF World U20 Championship where they finished last and were relegated back to Pool C for the 1995 World Championships. Romania competed in the Pool C tournament of the World Championships for the next four years but at the 1998 IIHF World U20 Championship they finished last in the Pool C tournament after losing to Great Britain and were relegated to Pool D. In 2001 after the a change in the format of the World Championships Romania was reseeded into the newly formed Division III tournament. They remained in the Division III tournament for two years before gaining promotion to Division II due to a restructuring which increased the number of teams in Division II to 12. In 2012 they finished first in the Division II Group B tournament being held in Tallinn, Estonia and gained promotion to Division II Group A. Following promotion in 2012 Romania competed in the 2013 IIHF U20 World Championship Division II Group A tournament being held in Brașov, Romania. The team finished third and retained their spot in Division II Group A for the following year.

Roberto Gliga currently holds the team record for most points with 43. Gliga competed at five World Championships for the Romanian under-20 team from 2009 to 2013 with his best result in 2012, when he scored 17 points in the Division II Group B tournament at the 2012 IIHF World U20 Championship.

International competitions

World Junior Championships

References

External links
Romanian Ice Hockey Federation
National Teams of Ice hockey Romania profile

Junior national ice hockey teams
Ice hockey